Charles Bellamy (fl. 1717–1720) was an English pirate who raided colonial American shipping in New England and later off the coast of Canada. He is often confused with the more well-known Samuel "Black Sam" Bellamy, as they operated in the same areas at the same time.

History

Bellamy raided with a fleet of three ships off the New England and Canadian east coasts in summer 1717, ranging as far north as the Bay of Fundy. Using slave labor he set up an encampment and a small fort (possibly at St. Andrew's), from which he attacked the fishing fleets off Newfoundland and Fortune Bay. Thinking he'd found a large merchant vessel in the Gulf of St. Lawrence, he accidentally engaged a French 36-gun warship which heavily damaged his ship and forced him to flee after a three-hour battle. Escaping at night under cover of a storm, he left to set up a new camp, either at Placentia or Oderin. After some years ashore he disappeared with his remaining loot.

Confusion with Samuel Bellamy

Samuel “Black Sam” Bellamy was active from 1716 to 1717 and engaged in piracy in the Caribbean and as far north as Cape Cod. Captain Charles Johnson's 1724 “General History of the Pyrates” contains a lengthy section on “Capt. Bellamy” including several speeches supposedly delivered to captured merchant captains. The speeches and monologues - extolling pirate freedoms and haranguing the captains for serving greedy masters - are generally thought to be Johnson's literary inventions. They were attributed by later writers to Charles Bellamy, along with the shipwreck which claimed Samuel Bellamy's life, and caused Philip Gosse to describe Charles Bellamy as “BELLAMY, Captain Charles. Pirate, Socialist, and orator. A famous West Indian filibuster.” An example of the speeches attributed by Johnson to “Bellamy,” and by others to Charles Bellamy:

See also
Stede Bonnet – another pirate captain whose deeds were conflated with Bellamy's by “Captain Charles Johnson”.

References

18th-century pirates
Year of birth missing
Year of death missing
British pirates
Caribbean pirates